The 158th Infantry Division "Zara" was an infantry division of the Royal Italian Army during World War II. The Zara was formed on 1 September 1942 and named for the city of Zadar. The Zara was classified as an occupation infantry division. The division remained on the Dalmatian coast until it was disbanded on 9 September 1943 in the wake of the announcement of the Armistice of Cassibile.

History 
On 1 January 1936 the Zara Garrison Troops Command was raised in the Italian exclave of Zara. The Troops Command consisted of the Ground Command with two machine gun battalions and one Bersaglieri battalion, the Artillery Command with three artillery groups, and the Coastal Command with minor coastal defense units.

World War II 
During the initial phase of the Axis' Invasion of Yugoslavia the Troops Command remained passive until 12 April 1941, when its units entered Yugoslavia and occupied Biograd na Moru, Nin, Obrovac, Benkovac, Skradin and Knin, where the Zara units met the vanguard of the 133rd Armored Division "Littorio".

On 1 September 1942 the Troops Command was reformed as 158th Infantry Division "Zara" and activated the 291st and 292th infantry regiments, and the 158th Artillery Regiment. The division was responsible for the Dalmatian coast south of Zadar, with units based in Knin, Split, Kaštela, Šibenik, Trogir and on the major islands along the coast. During its existence the division was engaged in anti-partisan activities, with heavy fighting occurring in Benkovac. After the announcement of the Armistice of Cassibile on 8 September 1943 the division was disbanded by invading German forces.

Organization 
  158th Infantry Division "Zara", in Zadar
 291st Infantry Regiment "Zara" (former Ground Command/ Zara Garrison Troops Command)
 Command Company
 Fusiliers Battalion "Diaz"
 Bersaglieri Battalion "Zara" (replaced on 18 May 1943 by the Fusiliers Battalion "Traù")
 Machine Gun Battalion "Spalato"
 Anti-tank Company (47/32 anti-tank guns)
 292nd Infantry Regiment "Zara" (former Coastal Command/ Zara Garrison Troops Command)
 Command Company
 Fusiliers Battalion "Cadorna"
 Fusiliers Battalion "Rismondo"
 Machine Gun Battalion "Dalmazia" (reorganized as Fusiliers Battalion on 18 May 1943)
 Support Weapons Company (65/17 infantry support guns)
 158th Artillery Regiment "Zara" (former Artillery Command/ Zara Garrison Troops Command)
 Command Unit
 Group "Chiarle"
 Group "Ederle"
 Group "Fadini"
 1x Anti-aircraft battery (20/65 Mod. 35 anti-aircraft guns)
 Ammunition and Supply Unit
 CCCXX Mixed Engineer Battalion
 158th Engineer Company
 258th Telegraph and Radio Operators Company
 158th Medical Section
 2x Field hospitals
 1x Surgical unit
 158th Supply Section
 113th Carabinieri Section
 141st Field Post Office

In 1943 the following units were attached to the division:
 11th Bersaglieri Regiment
 Command Company
 XV Bersaglieri Battalion
 XXVII Bersaglieri Battalion
 XXXIII Bersaglieri Battalion
 11th Bersaglieri Motorcyclists Company
 11th Anti-tank Company (47/32 anti-tank guns)
 107th CC.NN. Legion "Rismondo"
 CVII CC.NN. Battalion
 107th CC.NN. Machine Gun Company
 60th Guardia alla Frontiera Artillery Grouping

CROWCASS 
The names of five men attached to the division can be found in the Central Registry of War Criminals and Security Suspects (CROWCASS) set up by the Anglo-American Supreme Headquarters Allied Expeditionary Force in 1945. The names can be found at: Central Registry of War Criminals and Security Suspects from the Kingdom of Italy.

Commanding officers 
The division's commanding officers were:

 Generale di Brigata Carlo Viale (1 September 1942 – 9 September 1943)

References 

 

Infantry divisions of Italy in World War II
Military units and formations of Italy in Yugoslavia in World War II
Military units and formations established in 1942
Military units and formations disestablished in 1943